Barbodes herrei is an extinct species of cyprinid fish formerly endemic to Lake Lanao in Mindanao, the Philippines.  This species was commercially important to local peoples.

References

Barbodes
Freshwater fish of the Philippines
Endemic fauna of the Philippines
Fauna of Mindanao
Fish described in 1934
Taxonomy articles created by Polbot

zh:六帶無鬚魮